The Avenging Rider is a 1943 American Western film directed by Sam Nelson and starring Tim Holt.

The story was bought in December 1941 as a vehicle for Holt.

Premise
A cowboy tries to clear himself of murder.

References

External list
 

1943 films
1943 Western (genre) films
American Western (genre) films
American black-and-white films
1940s English-language films
Films directed by Sam Nelson
Films produced by Bert Gilroy
RKO Pictures films
1940s American films